Airay is a surname. Notable people with the name include:
 Christopher Airay (1601–1670), English preacher and logician.
 Henry Airay (died 1616), English priest and theologian.